Meader is a surname. Notable people with the surname include:

David Meader (born 1949), American politician
Elwyn Meader (1910–1996), American plant breeder
George Meader (1907–1994), American politician
Herman Lee Meader (1874–1930), American architect and author
Mary Meader (1916–2008), American photographer
Stephen W. Meader (1892–1977), American novelist
Vaughn Meader (1936–2004), American comedian, impersonator, musician, and film actor